Cristiano Biraghi (born 1 September 1992) is an Italian footballer who plays as a left back for Serie A club Fiorentina and the Italy national team.

Club career

Youth years 
Born in Cernusco sul Naviglio, the Province of Milan, Biraghi began his career with Internazionale, playing in their youth teams from 2005 onwards. For the 2007–08 season he spent time at Pro Sesto alongside his club compatriots and youth products. He started his career as a midfielder but later became a left back. He played a few friendlies for the club and participated in their 2010 summer tour, scoring a goal in the Pirelli Cup, helping them to a 3–0 victory over Manchester City.

Internazionale 
Biraghi made his first team debut in a competitive game on 24 November 2010, against Twente in the 2010–11 UEFA Champions League, replacing Goran Pandev. Before that match Inter had lost a number of first team players through injury.

Biraghi would be given a starting berth in Inter's next game in the Champions League, on 7 December 2010, against Werder Bremen in what would be a 3–0 home win for the German side, with the likes of Davide Santon moving to wing forward and Cristian Chivu unable to play due to an injury.

In July 2011, he was loaned to Serie B club Juve Stabia. On 27 August 2011, he made his debut for the club in the first league match of the season, a 2–1 loss against Empoli.

Cittadella 
In summer 2012, Biraghi was signed by Serie B club A.S. Cittadella on loan, with an option to sign half of the registration rights. In June 2013 Cittadella exercised the option for €150,000. However, Inter also paid a subsidy of €50,000 to Cittadella for the loan.

Biraghi was loaned to Catania on 2 September 2013 for €300,000.

Return to Internazionale 
In June 2014, Inter bought back Biraghi from Cittadella for €610,000 (€600,000 plus the remain 50% registration rights of Simone Pecorini). He signed a new four-year contract with Inter in 2014. However, he spent 2 seasons on loan to other clubs before he became a make-weight of another signing.

He signed a two-year loan deal with Chievo on 6 July 2014.

On 27 August 2015, Biraghi moved to La Liga side Granada CF, after agreeing to a one-year loan deal.

Pescara 
On 11 July 2016, Biraghi was sold to Serie A newcomers Pescara in a permanent deal. On the same day Pescara also signed Rey Manaj on loan, as well as Gianluca Caprari who was sold to Inter but loaned back to Pescara for a season. Pescara were relegated at the end of season.

Fiorentina 
On 15 August 2017, Biraghi joined Serie A club Fiorentina on loan, with an obligation to buy the player.

Second return to Internazionale
In August 2019, Biraghi was re-signed by Inter in a temporary deal, with Dalbert moving the opposite direction. Inter had an option to sign Biraghi from Fiorentina in a permanent deal in 2020 for a reported €12 million fee, but opted not to take this up.

International career 
Under the new regime of Ciro Ferrara, he made his U21 debut on 17 November 2010, as starting left back in the friendly match that Italy won 2–1 against Turkey. In that match he also featured alongside former Inter teammates Giulio Donati and Luca Caldirola in the defensive line.

He received his first call-up along with Felice Natalino in August 2010 for the 2011 UEFA European Under-21 Football Championship qualification. In the next month, he made his U19 debut against Serbia. Before that, he received only one call-up in 2009 from the U18 team.

He was given his first senior international call-up for Italy in September 2018, by manager Roberto Mancini, for Italy's opening UEFA Nations League matches against Poland and Portugal later that month. He made his senior international debut in Italy's 1–1 home draw against Poland on 7 September, in their UEFA Nations League opener. On 14 October 2018, he scored his first goal for Italy on his third cap in the return UEFA Nations League match away to Poland to secure a 1–0 win in the 92nd minute, which secured Italy's safety in the group; Biraghi dedicated his goal to former Fiorentina teammate Davide Astori who died early that year.

Career statistics

Club

International 

Scores and results list Italy's goal tally first, score column indicates score after each Biraghi goal.

Honours
Inter Milan
UEFA Europa League runner-up: 2019–20

Individual
Serie A Goal of the Month: February 2023

References

External links 

 Profile at the ACF Fiorentina website 
 FIGC Profile 
 AIC Club Profile 
 
 
 

1992 births
Living people
People from Cernusco sul Naviglio
Association football fullbacks
Italian footballers
Italy international footballers
Serie A players
Serie B players
Inter Milan players
S.S.D. Pro Sesto players
S.S. Juve Stabia players
A.S. Cittadella players
Catania S.S.D. players
A.C. ChievoVerona players
Delfino Pescara 1936 players
ACF Fiorentina players
La Liga players
Granada CF footballers
Italy youth international footballers
Italy under-21 international footballers
Italian expatriate footballers
Italian expatriate sportspeople in Spain
Expatriate footballers in Spain
Footballers from Lombardy
Sportspeople from the Metropolitan City of Milan
Outfield association footballers who played in goal